Ledsham is a village and civil parish  north of Castleford and  east of Leeds in the county of West Yorkshire, England. The village is in the City of Leeds metropolitan borough and near to the A1(M) motorway.  It had a population of 162 at the 2001 Census, increasing to 181 at the 2011 Census.

History 
However, it was recorded in a charter from 1030 as Ledesham. Like nearby Ledston, the name seems to refer to Leeds (or the Old English precursor of this name, Loidis, which denoted a region rather than a town); the second element is the Old English word hām ('homestead, farm'). The name thus meant 'the farm belonging to the region of Loidis'.

Ledsham parish once also included the township of Fairburn, whose name is likewise first attested around 1030, as Faren-burne. This name comes from the Old English words fearn ('fern') and burna ('spring, stream'), and thus meant 'spring characterised by ferns'.

Geography
To the east is Selby Fork junction, which is also partly in South Milford, in North Yorkshire, but previously in the West Riding; in the early 1960s, the M62 motorway was planned to have its eastern terminus at Ledsham, possibly at the Selby Fork junction.

Characteristics
There is a late seventh-century Anglo-Saxon church (the oldest church and the oldest building standing in West Yorkshire), and nearby Ledston Hall.  The village school, like schools in Collingham and Thorp Arch, was named after Lady Elizabeth Hastings. The school is now located in the nearby village of Ledston, which was rated as good by OFSTED in 2018.

Ledsham have a cricket team, who currently play in the York League.

Governance 
Historically, Ledsham was in the wapentake of Barkston Ash, but since 1974, it has been a part of the metropolitan borough of City of Leeds, in the county of West Yorkshire. It is its own civil parish, and is in the Kippax and Methley ward for local affairs, and is in the Elmet and Rothwell Constituency for national level politics.

See also
Listed buildings in Ledsham, West Yorkshire

References

External links

 

Villages in West Yorkshire
Places in Leeds
Civil parishes in West Yorkshire